Felix Gerson Badenhorst (born 12 June 1989) is a Liswati professional footballer who currently plays for TS Galaxy of the Premier Soccer League.

Club career
The midfielder began his career with Manzini Wanderers and was in 2008 a half year on loan with South African club Intsha Sporting. He later played for Jomo Cosmos and on loan for Manzini Wanderers. Before joining AS Vita Club he was a Mbabane Swallows F.C. player.

In October 2020 Badenhorst joined TS Galaxy of the South African Premier Soccer League from Mbombela United.

International career
Badenhorst has been a member of the Eswatini national football team since 2008.

International goals 
As of match played 14 July 2021. Swaziland score listed first, score column indicates score after each Badenhorst goal.

References

1989 births
Living people
Eswatini international footballers
Association football midfielders
Swazi expatriate footballers
Swazi footballers
Swazi expatriate sportspeople in South Africa
Manzini Wanderers F.C. players
Jomo Cosmos F.C. players
Mbabane Swallows players
AS Vita Club players
TS Galaxy F.C. players
Expatriate soccer players in South Africa
People from Shiselweni Region